The Adventures of Antar and Abla (translit. Mughamarat Antar wa Abla) is a 1948 Egyptian film directed by Salah Abu Seif. It was entered into the 1949 Cannes Film Festival.

Cast
 Seraj Munir as Antarah ibn Shaddad
 Kouka as Abla
 Zaki Toleimat
 Negma Ibrahim
 Stephan Rosti
 Farid Shawqi

References

External links

1948 films
1940s Arabic-language films
Egyptian black-and-white films
Films directed by Salah Abu Seif